Mike Spivey is a former senior-level administrator at Vanderbilt, Washington University in St. Louis, and the University of Colorado law schools. He is an author, motivational speaker, podcaster, and the founder of The Spivey Consulting Group, and he has been featured in national media outlets including The New York Times, Reuters, The Economist, USA Today, the ABA Journal, The Chronicle of Higher Education, U.S. News & World Report, CNN/Fortune, Above the Law, and Law.com. He was among the first higher education experts to write publicly about the possibility of university campuses remaining closed through fall 2020 in response to the COVID-19 pandemic and has been featured in the media in respect to how higher education should respond to pandemic-related concerns. He is a co-author of The PowerScore/Spivey Consulting Law School Admissions Bible, and his next book on overcoming hardship in life is scheduled to be published in late 2023.

He has published hundreds of articles on motivation, goal-setting, how to improve law schools, law school admissions, and legal employment and has been featured as a speaker at colleges and universities, including presenting with Civil Rights Leader Representative John Lewis and Wikipedia co-founder Jimmy Wales at the University of Alabama. He hosts a podcast, "Status Check with Spivey," in which he speaks about legal education and admissions and has interviewed a number of psychologists and researchers, including Judson A. Brewer, Guy Winch, Gabor Maté, Anna Lembke, and Kristin Neff. Spivey has served on the board of directors for two legal education entities — a non-profit and a tech startup — and is a former advisory board member for LexisNexis. He is from New Canaan, Connecticut and resides in Boulder, Colorado.

References

Living people
Vanderbilt University alumni
University of Colorado faculty
Vanderbilt University faculty
Washington University in St. Louis faculty
1972 births
University of Alabama alumni